Closed form may refer to:

Mathematics
 Closed-form expression, a finitary expression
 Closed differential form, a differential form  whose exterior derivative  is the zero form , meaning .

Poetry
 In poetry analysis, a type of poetry that exhibits regular structure, such as meter or a rhyming pattern
 Trobar clus, an allusive and obscure style adopted by some 12th-century troubadours

Mathematics disambiguation pages